Blanco County (Spanish: "white") is a United States county located in the U.S. state of Texas. It is located in Central Texas and its county seat is Johnson City.

As of the 2020 census, the population was 11,374. 

The county is named for the Blanco River that traverses the county.

History

 1150 AD Indigenous peoples first inhabitants, possible ancestors of the Lipan Apache.
 1721 José de Azlor y Virto de Vera names the Blanco River.
 1826 Benjamin Milam is given a contract to settle 300 families between the Colorado and Guadalupe rivers.
 1836 Comanches claim all land in Blanco County.
 1847 Meusebach–Comanche Treaty
 1850s Samuel Ealy Johnson, Sr., grandfather of President Lyndon B. Johnson, and his brother Jesse Thomas Johnson, set up a cattle business in Johnson City. The town is named after their nephew James Polk Johnson. The Johnson family emigrated from Alabama.
 1854-1855 Captain James Hughes Callahan and Eli Clemens Hinds become Blanco's first white settlers. Joseph Bird establishes Birdtown, now Round Mountain. General John D. Pitts, Judge William S. Jones, Andrew M. Lindsay, James Hughes Callahan and F.W. Chandler charter the Pittsburgh Land Company. They purchase the league granted to Horace Eggleston by the government of Coahuila y Tejas in 1835 and lay out the town of Pittsburgh, Texas, named for General Pitts, across the river from the site of future Blanco.
 1858, February 12 - Blanco County is formed from parts of Comal, Hays, Burnet and Gillespie, and is named for the Blanco River. County seat is also named Blanco.
 1860 Population of 1218, includes 98 slaves.  Settlers are mostly Anglo-Saxon Protestants hailing from Tennessee and Alabama. Agriculture and livestock are central to the economy.
 1861 County votes against secession from the Union.
 1862 Legislature establishes Kendall from part of Blanco southwestern border. Legislature in turn incorporates parts of Hays and Burnet into Blanco.
 1885 Replacement of courthouse by limestone structure now known as “The Old Courthouse”.
 1883 Blanco High School is chartered.
 1890 Johnson City becomes the new county seat.
 1910 Cotton becomes one of the county's most important crops.
 1900-1930 County farmers diversify into peanuts, peaches, pecans, pears, plums, grapes, and figs.
 1915 Samuel Ealy Johnson, Jr. and his wife Rebekah Baines Johnson, parents of President Lyndon Baines Johnson, move into their home in Johnson City with their five children, Lucia, Sam Houston, Josefa, Rebekah, and Lyndon Baines Johnson.
 1929 More than 20,000 peach and pecan trees harvested in the county.
 1933-1942 Civilian Conservation Corps public work relief program helps improve county parks and infrastructure.
 1934 Blanco State Park opens.
 1937 Lyndon Baines Johnson launches his first campaign for Congress from the east porch of the family's Johnson City home.
 1938 LBJ becomes a fierce advocate for rural electrification.  First light bulb turned on in rural Blanco County.
 1960s Lyndon B. Johnson becomes Vice President of the United States and subsequently President of the United States. Tourism becomes an important industry.
 1970 Pedernales Falls State Park opens to the public.

Demographics

Note: the US Census treats Hispanic/Latino as an ethnic category. This table excludes Latinos from the racial categories and assigns them to a separate category. Hispanics/Latinos can be of any race.

As of the census of 2000, there were 8,418 people, 3,303 households, and 2,391 families residing in the county.  The population density was 12 people per square mile (5/km2).  There were 4,031 housing units at an average density of 6 per square mile (2/km2).  The racial makeup of the county was 90.97% White, 0.74% Black or African American, 0.59% Native American, 0.19% Asian, 0.01% Pacific Islander, 5.88% from other races, and 1.62% from two or more races.  15.32% of the population were Hispanic or Latino of any race.

There were 3,303 households, out of which 30.40% had children under the age of 18 living with them, 61.50% were married couples living together, 7.20% had a female householder with no husband present, and 27.60% were non-families. 24.00% of all households were made up of individuals, and 10.80% had someone living alone who was 65 years of age or older.  The average household size was 2.50 and the average family size was 2.96.

In the county, the population was spread out, with 24.40% under the age of 18, 6.20% from 18 to 24, 25.60% from 25 to 44, 27.10% from 45 to 64, and 16.70% who were 65 years of age or older.  The median age was 41 years. For every 100 females, there were 97.70 males.  For every 100 females age 18 and over, there were 94.90 males.

The median income for a household in the county was $39,369, and the median income for a family was $45,382. Males had a median income of $31,717 versus $21,879 for females. The per capita income for the county was $19,721.  About 8.10% of families and 11.20% of the population were below the poverty line, including 14.20% of those under age 18 and 9.80% of those age 65 or over.

Geography

Blanco County is located in the Hill Country of central Texas, west of Austin and north of San Antonio. Two significant rivers, the Blanco and the Pedernales, flow through the county.

Major highways
  U.S. Highway 281
  U.S. Highway 290
  Ranch Road 1

Adjacent counties
 Burnet County (north)
 Travis County (northeast)
 Hays County (east)
 Comal County (southeast)
 Kendall County (southwest)
 Gillespie County (west)
 Llano County (northwest)

National protected area
 Lyndon B. Johnson National Historical Park (part)

Texas Parklands
 Pedernales Falls State Park

Politics

Communities

Cities
 Blanco
 Johnson City (county seat)

Town
 Round Mountain

Unincorporated communities
 Blowout
 Cypress Mill
 Flugrath
 Hye
 Peyton
 Post Oak
 Rocky Creek
 Sandy
 Twin Sisters

Education
School districts:
 Blanco Independent School District
 Fredericksburg Independent School District
 Johnson City Independent School District

Austin Community College is the designated community college for the county.

See also

 USS Blanco County (LST-344)
 Lyndon B. Johnson National Historical Park 
 National Register of Historic Places listings in Blanco County, Texas
 Recorded Texas Historic Landmarks in Blanco County

References

External links

 Blanco County government
 
 Blanco County from the Texas Almanac
 Blanco County from the TXGenWeb Project

 
1858 establishments in Texas
Populated places established in 1858
Texas Hill Country